Johnathon is a given name. It is an alternate spelling of Jonathan. It may refer to:

Johnathon Schaech (born 1969), American actor
Johnathon Ford (born 1989), Australian rugby league footballer
Johnathon Jones (born 1988), American professional basketball player
Johnathon Banks  (born 1982), American former professional boxer
Simon Jonathon Gallup (born 1960), English musician